Li Xin (born November 9, 1989) is a Chinese football player.

Club career
Li Xin would play for the Shenzhen Ruby youth team before he was loaned to their satellite team Xiangxue Eisiti, which would play as a foreign team in the 2008–09 Hong Kong First Division League. He would make his professional debut in a league game on 18 January 2009 against Eastern AA that ended in a 5-1 defeat that also saw him score his first goal. On his return he would be promoted to the senior Shenzhen team and during the 2009 Chinese Super League season and he would go on to make his debut in the club's first league game of the season against Shandong Luneng on March 22, 2009 in a 1-1 draw.

In 2015, Li signed for Shenzhen Renren.

Career statistics 
As of 31 December 2020.

References

External links
Player profile at Sodasoccer.com

1989 births
Living people
People from Binzhou
Chinese footballers
Footballers from Shandong
Hong Kong First Division League players
Shenzhen F.C. players
Meizhou Hakka F.C. players
Shenyang Dongjin players
Chinese Super League players
Association football midfielders